Ulrich Stockmann (born 1 January 1951 in Oebisfelde) is a German politician who served as a Member of the European Parliament from 1994 until 2009. He is a member of the Social Democratic Party of Germany, part of the Socialist Group.

In parliament, Stockmann served on the Committee on Transport and Tourism. He was also a substitute for the Committee on the Environment, Public Health and Food Safety, a member of the Delegation for relations with Israel and a substitute for the Delegation to the EU-Chile Joint Parliamentary Committee.

Career
 1969-1973: Studied architecture and construction

Education
 1973: graduated in regional and urban planning
 1982: First theological examination
 1985: second theological examination
 1988: ordained in
 1973-1975: Research assistant, Academy for Industrial and General Building Development
 Senior Architect's Office, Berlin
 1975-1976: studied in Berlin-Weißensee and Adlershof
 1976-1982: Studied theology at Naumburg and Berlin
 1982-1988: Worked with young people in Community for the Resurrection
 1988-1990: Chaplain to young people and students in Naumburg
 Chairman of the Naumburg SPD Local and District Association
 1994: Member of the Saxony-Anhalt SPD Association Executive Committee
 1990: Vice-Chairman of the SPD Group in the Volkskammer
 since 1994: Member of the European Parliament
 1994-1999: Vice-Chairman of the European Parliament Israel Delegation

Decorations
 1998: Order of Merit with ribbon, Federal Republic of Germany

External links

 
 
 

1951 births
Living people
Social Democratic Party of Germany MEPs
MEPs for Germany 2004–2009
Recipients of the Cross of the Order of Merit of the Federal Republic of Germany
MEPs for Germany 1994–1999
MEPs for Germany 1999–2004